The VIIth Coming is the seventh full-length album by the British doom metal band Cathedral. It was released on 5 November 2002 by Spitfire.

Track listing

Personnel
Cathedral
 Lee Dorrian – vocals
 Garry Jennings – guitars
 Leo Smee – bass guitar
 Brian Dixon – drums

Additional musicians
 Munch – keyboard, mellotron

References

Cathedral (band) albums
2002 albums
Spitfire Records albums